Jari Askins (born April 27, 1953) is an American judge, lawyer and Democratic politician from the US state of Oklahoma. She was the 15th lieutenant governor of Oklahoma, being the second woman and the first female Democratic Party member to hold that position.

Askins won the Oklahoma Democratic Party's 2010 gubernatorial nomination by defeating Attorney General Drew Edmondson. She was defeated in the general election by Republican Congresswoman Mary Fallin.

Early life, education and career
Askins was born on April 27, 1953, in Duncan, Oklahoma. She graduated from Duncan High School in 1971. She then attended the University of Oklahoma to receive a Bachelor of Arts in Journalism in 1975.  While at OU, she was a member of the Alpha Chi Omega sorority. Askins received a Juris Doctor from the University of Oklahoma College of Law in 1980. After graduating from OU, she entered into private practice.

In 1982, Askins was appointed Special District Judge of Stephens County, Oklahoma. She served from 1982 to 1990, winning reelection in 1986. Under the administration of Governor of Oklahoma David Walters, Askins entered the executive branch of government. She was the Chair of the Oklahoma Pardon and Parole Board from 1991 to 1992, serving as the Board's first female chair. Askins served as Deputy General Counsel to Governor Walters from 1992 to 1994. Her last assignment under Governor Walters was as the Executive Director of the Pardon and Parole Board from February to November 1994.

Oklahoma House of Representatives (1995-2007)

Before Governor Walters was succeeded by Republican Frank Keating, Askins ran, and was elected to, the Oklahoma House of Representatives, beginning her term in 1995. She served six terms in office (12 years), the maximum combined service allowed in the Oklahoma Legislature as the Representative of the 50th House District, which includes her home town, Duncan.

During her final term (2005–2006), she was elected and served as Democratic House Minority Leader, the first woman to lead a caucus in the state's legislature.

2006 lieutenant governor campaign 
After reaching the mandatory legislative term limit of 12 years, Askins filed in the Democratic primary election to replace outgoing Republican Mary Fallin as Lieutenant Governor of Oklahoma. In the primaries, Askins faced former State Senate President Pro Tempore Cal Hobson, lobbyist Pete Regan, and Jim Rogers. Askins received the highest share of votes of the four candidates (40.2%), and advanced to the Democratic primary runoff, competing against Pete Regan.

In the run-off election on August 22, 2006, Askins defeated Regan, thus gaining the Democratic nomination for lieutenant governor. Her general election opponents included Republican Speaker of the House Todd Hiett, and E.Z. Million, an independent candidate from Norman. Hiett sought to maintain Republican control of the office, which had been held by then-incumbent Mary Fallin, since 1995. Askins campaigned in part on her experience in state government, with roles in all three branches of Oklahoma government: legislative (state representative), executive (Chair of the Pardon and Parole Board), and judicial (Special District Judge).

Askins defeated Hiett and Million in the general election on November 7, 2006, becoming the first Democratic female (and second overall) to be elected lieutenant governor in Oklahoma.

Lieutenant Governor (2006-2010) 
Askins' predecessor in the lieutenant governorship, Mary Fallin resigned from office on December 28, 2006, to be sworn in to her term in the U.S. House of Representatives. Effective January 2, 2007, Fallin's resignation allowed then-Governor Brad Henry to appoint Askins (who was at that point the lieutenant governor-elect) to serve the final week of Fallin's term. At the conclusion of that term, on January 8, 2007, Askins then formally started her own full term of office.

As lieutenant governor, Askins served on various boards and commissions, including chairing the Oklahoma Tourism and Recreation Commission and the Oklahoma Film and Music Advisory Commission. Governor Brad Henry also named her as "Oklahoma's Small Business Advocate". Oklahoma's 100th anniversary as a U.S state coincided with Lt. Gov Askins' and Governor Henry's terms, with both participating in Statehood Week commemorations. Askins, in her role as President of the Oklahoma State Senate presided over a legislative session held in Guthrie, Oklahoma's capitol at the time of statehood.

2010 gubernatorial campaign

Askins announced on January 4, 2009 that she would run for governor in 2010 to succeed term-limited Brad Henry. She was the first candidate to declare an intention to run.

As announced on July 27, 2010, Jari Askins won the Democratic primary against then-Oklahoma Attorney General Drew Edmondson and was on the November ballot for governor, facing Republican candidate Mary Fallin. The Askins vs. Fallin race and the simultaneous Diane Denish vs. Susana Martinez race in New Mexico were the third and fourth cases of woman vs. woman gubernatorial races in U.S. history. The two Oklahoma candidates participated in a single lieutenant governor's debate on October 19, 2010.  Fallin won the election, becoming Oklahoma's first female governor. Askins only carried four counties, including her home county of Stephens County.

Post-electoral career
In April 2015, Governor Mary Fallin, named Askins as a special advisor on child welfare and implementation of Oklahoma's Pinnacle Plan. In the role, Askins was responsible for reforms to Oklahoma's Department of Human Services ordered by courts, following a class action lawsuit related to deficiencies found in Oklahoma's foster care system.

Shortly after her appointment as a special advisor, Askins was next appointed to government service tied to the judicial branch. Askins was selected in September 2015 by the Oklahoma Supreme Court to lead the Oklahoma Administrative Office of the Courts, succeeding retiring director Michael Evans. Askins performed the role under supervision of the Chief Justice of the Oklahoma Supreme Court, to oversee Oklahoma's judicial system. Included in the responsibilities of the Director are operations, budget and personnel matters in all 77 district courts and Oklahoma's courts of special jurisdiction.

Personal life
Askins has been inducted into the Oklahoma Women's Hall of Fame. According to her campaign website, she is an active member of the First Christian Church of Duncan, a Christian Church (Disciples of Christ) congregation.

Electoral history

See also 
List of female lieutenant governors in the United States

References

External links
Oklahoma Lieutenant Governor Jari Askins official state site
Jari Askins for Governor official campaign site
Jari Askins – Women of the Oklahoma Legislature Oral History Project, Oklahoma Oral History Research Program

|-

|-

1953 births
21st-century American politicians
21st-century American women politicians
American Disciples of Christ
Candidates in the 2010 United States elections
Lieutenant Governors of Oklahoma
Living people
Democratic Party members of the Oklahoma House of Representatives
Oklahoma lawyers
People from Duncan, Oklahoma
University of Oklahoma College of Law alumni
Women state legislators in Oklahoma